MV Louden was acquired by the Maritime Commission (MARCOM) on a loan charter basis and renamed USS Piscataqua (AOG-70), she was to be a type T1  built for the US Navy during World War II. She was named after the Piscataqua River, between New Hampshire and Maine. Piscataqua (AOG-70) was never commissioned into the US Navy.

Construction
Louden (AOG-70) was laid down on 24 March 1945, under a Maritime Commission (MARCOM) contract, MC hull 2630, by the St. Johns River Shipbuilding Company, Jacksonville, Florida; she was renamed Piscataqua, but acquisition by the US Navy was cancelled 26 August 1945.

Piscataqua was launched on 26 May 1945, and was about 80.3% complete when, due to the end of World War II, the ship's US Navy reassignment was canceled. She reverted to her original name of Louden. The unfinished ship was completed by the Maryland Drydock Company, Baltimore, Maryland, in 1947, and sold to the International Tankers, 16 July 1947.

Career
Louden was resold in 1948, and renamed Transwel. Transwel was resold in 1950, and renamed Salamanca. Salamanca was scrapped in 1972.

References

Bibliography

External links 

 

Type T1-M-BT1 tankers
Klickitat-class gasoline tankers
Ships built in Jacksonville, Florida
1945 ships
Merchant ships of the United States